Baleqlu (also romanized as Bāleqlū) is a village in Jaydasht Rural District, in the Central District of Firuzabad County, Fars Province, Iran. At the 2006 census, its population was 25, in 5 families.

References 

Populated places in Firuzabad County